PI04 (stylized as π04) is the fourth EP by JK Flesh, a moniker of English musician Justin Broadrick, and was released on 2 February 2018 through Pi Electronics. The EP features a remix by American DJ and producer Silent Servant. This is the fourth release of the Pi Electronics label, and was made available as a limited LP.

Release
PI04 was released on 2 February 2018 as a 12-inch EP limited to 300 copies. The release features no cover, but is instead packaged with a card featuring artwork of an armored man.

Track listing

Personnel
 Justin Broadrick – instruments, production
 John Juan Mendez – remixing (4)

References

Justin Broadrick albums
Albums produced by Justin Broadrick
2018 EPs